The 2010 Breeders' Cup World Championships was the 27th edition of thoroughbred racing's season ending premier event, and took place on November 5 and 6 at Churchill Downs in Louisville, Kentucky.

Friday
The attendance was 41,614.

Saturday

The attendance was 72,739.
The highlight of the day was the much anticipated performance of Zenyatta who was vying for her 20th consecutive victory and second Breeders' Cup Classic.

See also
 2010 Kentucky Derby

References

Breeders' Cup
Breeders' Cup, 2010
Breeders' Cup
2010 in horse racing